Stella is an autobiographical 2008 French film directed by Sylvie Verheyde.

Cast 
 Léora Barbara as Stella
 Mélissa Rodrigues as Gladys
 Laëtitia Guerard as Geneviève
 Benjamin Biolay as Stella's father
 Karole Rocher as Stella's mother
 Thierry Neuvic as Yvon
 Guillaume Depardieu as Alain-Bernard
 Anne Benoît as Madame Douchewsky

Festivals and awards
Official selection at the 2009 Seattle International Film Festival
The Lina Mangiacapre Award, and also a Christopher D. Smithers Foundation Special Award for education about the disease of alcoholism, at the 65th Venice International Film Festival

References

External links

2008 films
French drama films
2000s French-language films
2008 drama films
Films directed by Sylvie Verheyde
2000s French films